The 1982 McNeese State Cowboys football team was an American football team that represented McNeese State University as a member of the Southland Conference (Southland) during the 1982 NCAA Division I-AA football season. In their first year under head coach Hubert Boales, the team compiled an overall record of 4–6–1, with a mark of 2–3 in conference play, and finished tied for third in the Southland.

Schedule

References

McNeese State
McNeese Cowboys football seasons
McNeese State Cowboys football